Steinar (born 1994) is an Icelandic singer.

Steinar may also refer to:
Steinar (name), a given name (and list of people with the name)
Thor Steinar, a German clothing brand by Thor Steinar Mediatex GmbH 
Steinar, Icelandic record label now part of Sena